Magra District is a district of M'Sila Province, Algeria.

Municipalities
The district is further divided into 5 municipalities:
Magra
Berhoum
Aïn Khadra
Belaiba
Dehahna

District of M'Sila Province